Sivali Central College is a school situated in Hidellana, near Ratnapura, Sabaragamuwa Province, Sri Lanka. The school provides secondary education to boys and girls aged 11 to 19 and has a student population of around 3,500.

History
Sivali Central College was founded as a  Buddhist secondary school unconnected to any monastery in 1909 by A. C. Attygalle. It was initially located in a small house on Warakathota Road in Ratnapura.
In 1925 the chief monk of Nadun Viharay in Ratnapura offered the property Sivali Garden to the school and in 1935 it was renamed as Sivali College. With the introduction of the free education system by C. W. W. Kannangara, Sivali College became the Sivali Central College. It was the first Central College in Ratnapura district. It moved to Hidellana in 1955. Sivali Central College became a National College on 5 February 1992.

Principals
 Mahanuwara Seneviratne(1909-1914) 
 Francis Perera (1914-1919)
 M.A. Peter (1919-1926)
 P.J. Jayaratne (1926-05-03 - 1930-09-14)
 K. A. Dalpadadu (1930-09-15 - 1944-01-31)
 D.T. Deevendra (1944-03-01 - 1948-05-01)
 R.D. Sirisena (1949-05-03 - 1951-05-07)
 M.B. Ratnayake (1951-10-01 - 1955-12-02)
 D.D.P. Samaraweera (1956-01-02 - 1964-01-04)
 W.A.D.S Gunathilake (1964-02-04 - 1966-03-10)
 H.B. Weerakoon (1966-08-13 - 1968-02-24)
 C.T.M Fernando (1968-03-15 - 1973-05-14)
 U.B. Ratnayake (1973-05-14 - 1973-06-25)
 Daya Akuretiyagama (1973-07-02 - 1974-12-20)
 Capt. Wickman B Ramachandra (1975-01-01 - 1976-05-10 and 1991-05-01 - 1992-10-12)
 Mohan Sri Kantha Gunasekara (1978-08-01 - 1986-08-11)
 W.M.D.A. Bandara (1986-10-06 - 1988-06-16)
 Ariyadasa Withanage (1992-10-28 - 1994-09-28)
 W.M Gunathilake ( 1988-06-16 - 1991-03-11 and 1994 - 2001)
 Dhanapala Mudiyanselage Gunarathne (2001-05-25 - 2004-02-24)
 Dissanayake Mudiyanselage Gunarathne (2004-03-03 - 2007-08-09)
 K.K.P. Ariyasinghe (2008-05-15 - 2020)
 Neel Wathukarawaththa (Present Principal)

References

Educational institutions established in 1909
National schools in Sri Lanka
Boarding schools in Sri Lanka
Schools in Ratnapura
1909 establishments in Ceylon